Mannheim Steamroller Meets the Mouse: Unique Musical Creations Based on Disney Songs is a Disney-themed music album by Mannheim Steamroller, released by Walt Disney Records and American Gramaphone in 1999 on CD and DVD. It  features a few vintage songs from Walt Disney's era including Heigh-Ho, When You Wish Upon a Star, Zip-a-Dee-Doo-Dah, The Ballad of Davy Crockett and Mickey Mouse March.

Track listing

References

1999 albums
Disney albums
Mannheim Steamroller albums
American Gramaphone albums
Walt Disney Records albums